Luis Alberto Valdez Farías (born 2 April 1979) is a Peruvian politician. He is a Congressman representing La Libertad for the 2020–2021 term, and belongs to the Alliance for Progress party.

Biography 
Valdez Farías is a lawyer from the César Vallejo University. He has a master's degree in law with a Mention in Labor Law and Social Security from the National University of Trujillo.

He worked in the Provincial Municipality of Trujillo as Municipal Manager between 2010 and 2014 and Manager of Legal Advice between 2007 and 2010. He was an advisor to the César Vallejo University between 2000 and 2014.

Political career

Lieutenant Governor of La Libertad and Governor of La Libertad 
Entering politics in the 2014 regional elections, he was elected Lieutenant Governor of La Libertad Region and served from January 2015 until governor César Acuña Peralta resigned in October 2015, in order to run for president in the 2016 general election under the Alliance for the Progress of Peru coalition in which, he was disqualified on 9 March 2016. He thus served as Governor throughout the 2015–2018 term and left office on 31 December 2018.

Congressman 
In the 2020 snap elections, Valdez was elected to Congress, representing the La Libertad Region. Valdez served as the Interim President of Congress from 10 to 15 November 2020, following the removal of the previous President, Martín Vizcarra the subsequent constitutional succession of Manuel Merino to that position, which required him leaving office as the President of Congress. As his first deputy, Valdez assumed the position in an acting capacity.

During the second presidential vacancy process against Vizcarra, Valdéz voted in favor of the declaration of moral incapacity against Martín Vizcarra. The vacancy was approved by 105 parliamentarians on November 9, 2020.

Party politics 
On party level, he serves as Secretary General of Alliance for Progress since October 2019.

References

1979 births
Living people
Alliance for Progress (Peru) politicians
Members of the Congress of the Republic of Peru
National University of Trujillo alumni
People from Piura Region
21st-century Peruvian politicians